Piece of Mind is the debut studio album by American rapper Tela. It was released on November 5, 1996 through Suave House/Relativity Records. Production was handled by Tela himself with DJ Slice T, Jazze Pha, T-Mix and Insane Wayne. It features guest appearances from 8Ball & MJG, Crime Boss, South Circle and NOLA. The album peaked at number 70 on the Billboard 200 and number 17 on the Top R&B/Hip-Hop Albums. Its lead single, "Sho Nuff", peaked at No. 58 on the Billboard Hot 100.

Track listing

Personnel
Winston "Tela" Rogers – main artist, producer, mixing
Mr. Mike Walls – featured artist (track 3)
Thurston "Crime Boss" Slaughter – featured artist (track 3)
Premro "8Ball" Smith – featured artist (track 7)
Marlon "MJG" Goodwin – featured artist (track 7)
Toni Hickman – featured artist (track 10)
Tylene Mercadel – featured artist (track 10)
Suns Of Soul – additional vocals (tracks: 1, 15)
Tyree Robinson – additional vocals (track 2)
Phalon "Jazze Pha" Alexander – additional vocals (tracks: 3, 5, 7, 10, 12, 13), keyboards (tracks: 3, 7), drum programming (track 3), producer (tracks: 3, 7, 13)
Thomas "Low Key" McCollum – additional vocals (track 4)
Marcus McRee – additional vocals (tracks: 5, 9, 13, 14)
Mac Rodd – additional vocals (tracks: 6, 12)
Mista Rodd – additional vocals (tracks: 6, 12)
Nathaniel Malone – additional vocals (track 6)
The Care Bear – additional vocals (track 9)
B. McRay – additional vocals (track 13)
Baby Dre – additional vocals (tracks: 13, 14)
Gee-Kay – additional vocals (track 13)
L. McRay – additional vocals (track 13)
Mr. Rob – additional vocals (track 13)
Sheldon "Slice T" Arrington – keyboards, drum programming, producer (tracks: 1, 2, 5, 8-15), mixing
Niko Lyras – guitar (track 1), acoustic guitar (track 12)
Neal Jones – guitar (track 2), bass (tracks: 1, 7, 9), engineering (tracks: 1-3, 5-14), mixing
Lawrence Long – guitar (track 4)
Tristan "T-Mix" Jones – keyboards & producer (track 4)
Adam Warren – guitar (track 9)
Derrel Harris – Rhodes piano & drums (track 9)
Ferrell "Ensayne Wayne" Miles – producer (track 13)
Roger Tausz – mixing
Clay "Jus Fresh" James – engineering
Tony Dawsey – mastering
James Endsley – executive producer
Tony Draper – executive producer
Pen & Pixel – artwork, design

Charts

References

External links

 Tela - Piece Of Mind - Goldhiphop

G-funk albums
1996 debut albums
Tela (rapper) albums
Relativity Records albums
Albums produced by Jazze Pha